Meril-Prothom Alo Award for Best Film Actress is given by Meril-Prothom Alo as part of its annual Meril-Prothom Alo Awards for Bengali films, to recognise the female actor who has delivered an outstanding performance in a leading role. The award was first given in 1999.

Multiple winners
 10 Wins: Shabnur
 2 Wins: Moushumi, Purnima, Jaya Ahsan

Multiple nominees
 13 Nominations: Shabnur
 10 Nominations: Moushumi, Apu Biswas
 09 Nominations: Purnima
 06 Nominations: Jaya Ahsan
 04 Nominations: Mahiya Mahi, Nusrat Imrose Tisha
 03 Nominations: Bidya Sinha Saha Mim
 02 Nominations: Pori Moni, Zakia Bari Mamo

Winners and nominees

1990s

2000s

2010s

See also
 Meril-Prothom Alo Critics Award for Best Film Actress
 Meril-Prothom Alo Awards

References

External links

Best Film Actress
Film awards for lead actress